Honor Swinton Byrne (born 6 October 1997) is a British actress and daughter of playwright John Byrne and actress Tilda Swinton. Swinton Byrne had a cameo role in the 2009 film I Am Love, and stars in the Joanna Hogg films The Souvenir (2019) and its sequel The Souvenir Part II.

Early life
Swinton Byrne was born in the Royal Borough of Kensington and Chelsea, London, on 6 October 1997. Her father is the Scottish playwright John Byrne, and her mother is the actress Tilda Swinton. She has a twin brother, Xavier. She also has two other half-siblings from her father's previous marriage.

Swinton Byrne and her brother were raised in the Scottish Highlands and attended Drumduan School, Forres, an independent alternative education school based on the philosophy of Rudolf Steiner co-founded by her mother in 2013.

Swinton Byrne's first film role was a non-speaking cameo in her mother's 2009 film I Am Love as a younger version of her mother's character, Emma. Her first starring role is in The Souvenir, a semi-autobiographical film directed by Joanna Hogg in which she stars as Julie, a film school student who embarks on a relationship with an older man.

As of March 2011, Swinton Byrne lived in Nairn, overlooking the Moray Firth in the Highland region of Scotland, with her brother, mother and her mother's partner Sandro Kopp, a German painter.

Filmography

Awards and nominations

References

External links

Living people
Scottish actresses
1997 births
People from the Royal Borough of Kensington and Chelsea
Anglo-Scots
Actresses from London